Malinauskas is a Lithuanian language family name. It may refer to:
Donatas Malinauskas (1877–1942), Lithuanian politician and diplomat
Mindaugas Malinauskas (b. 1983), Lithuanian football goalkeeper 
Peter Malinauskas (b. 1980), Australian politician, premier of South Australia from 21 March 2022
Joe Malin, (born Joe Malinauskas, 1988), Scottish football goalkeeper

Lithuanian-language surnames